Cerro Quemado (Burned Mountain) is a mountain in the Andes Mountains of Argentina.

See also 
 Sacabaya (volcano, aka 'Tambo Quemado')
 Almolonga (Guatemala, aka "Cerro Quemado" or "La Muela" (The Molar))
 Catamarca Province
List of mountains in the Andes

External links 
 Casa de Piedra High school student leads archaeologists to lost Inca settlement. (It's called 'Cerro Quemado' and is in the Yocavil valley.)

Quemado, Cerro